The West Michigan Ironmen are a professional indoor football team based in Muskegon, Michigan (and representing the larger region which also includes Grand Rapids and Holland), the Ironmen play their home games at Trinity Health Arena. The team joined American Indoor Football (AIF) in 2016. The AIF ceased operations following the 2016 season, leaving the Ironmen without a league. They joined Champions Indoor Football for the 2017 season. For the 2018 season, the team was originally announced to have joined the Indoor Football League, however, the team was forced to sit out the 2018 Indoor Football League season. The team was then sold and played in the regional Midwest Professional Indoor Football for the 2018 season until they could rejoin the CIF in 2019. However, they were not among the list of members for the 2019 CIF season and instead joined the American Arena League.

The Ironmen are the second indoor football team to play in Muskegon, after the Muskegon Thunder which played in the Continental Indoor Football League for the 2007 and 2008 seasons and later the Indoor Football League for its inaugural 2009 season before moving to Grand Rapids and becoming the West Michigan ThunderHawks the next year.

Franchise history

American Indoor Football

In July 2015, it was announced that Terrence Williams was awarded an expansion team in American Indoor Football (AIF) for the 2016 season. After a "name-the-team" contest, the nickname Ironmen was chosen for the expansion franchise.

The Ironmen dropped their first game of the season, but would win every game following that, en route to a berth in the AIF Championship Game. The Ironmen would lose the AIF Championship Game to the Columbus Lions, 32–74, after the game was cut short by multiple altercations leading the Ironmen to leave the field citing safety reasons.

On July 18, 2016, the AIF announced it was ceasing operations leaving the team without a league.

Champions Indoor Football and Indoor Football League
The Ironmen announced on September 26, that it was joining Champions Indoor Football (CIF) for the 2017 season. The Ironmen went 4–8 and missed the playoffs.

On September 12, 2017, the Indoor Football League announced it had added the West Michigan Ironmen, as well as the Bloomington Edge, from the CIF. The CIF then attempted to sue the IFL, Edge, and Ironmen for leaving the CIF after the two teams had already signed league affiliation agreements with the CIF for the 2018 season. While the CIF did drop the lawsuit against the IFL, it filed for an injunction against the Edge and Ironmen teams from participating in the IFL for breaking the terms of their signed affiliation agreements. A temporary injunction from participation against the two teams was granted on January 31, 2018, with the judge citing that both teams had been bribed into breaking their contracts with the CIF.

Both teams participation in the IFL was suspended for the 2018 season, while still considered members, and Bloomington announced both teams would play independent schedules. As part of the injunction, the Ironmen cannot play any games for as long as the 2018 CIF season lasts.

Midwest Professional Indoor Football
On March 3, 2018, owner Terrence Williams then posted on social media that he had sold the team to another local group and the Ironmen would be participating in the semi-professional regional Midwest Professional Indoor Football (MPIF) for the 2018 season. The Ironmen went undefeated at 3–0 through the MPIF season with several teams folding during the season. On April 21, 2018, the first-seed Ironmen beat the second-seed and defending MPIF champion Midway Marauders 68–44 at home to win the MPIF championship.

American Arena League
Two days after winning the MPIF championship, the Ironmen were accepted to return to the CIF for the 2019 season. Upon the release of the 2019 season schedule, the Ironmen were not listed as members.

On January 18, 2019, the Ironmen posted on social media that it had joined the American Arena League (AAL) for the 2019 season along with the remaining teams from the MPIF as a Midwest Division. The Ironmen won the division title over the Indianapolis Enforcers, the only other team in the division to finish the season, before losing the league semifinal game to the West Virginia Roughriders.

The 2020 season was cancelled due to the onset of the COVID-19 pandemic with no games played by any team in the league. The following season, the team played four games with several cancellations by other Midwest Division teams. The AAL chose not to hold a 2021 championship playoff, but stated each division would have their own champion. The Ironmen planned to hold a division championship game on June 5, 2021, but no opponents committed to playing and the team was named the division champions.

Statistics and records

Season-by-season results

Head coach records
Note: Statistics are correct through the end of the 2021 AAL season.

References

External links
West Michigan Ironmen official website

 
2015 establishments in Michigan